Chelaethiops congicus is an African  species of freshwater fish in the family Cyprinidae. It is found in the Congo River basin and in the Lake Tanganyika basin.

References

Chelaethiops
Fish described in 1917